Robert Davies Marland (born 13 May 1964 in Mississauga, Ontario) is a retired rower from Canada. He competed in two consecutive Summer Olympics for his native country, starting in 1988. At his second appearance, he was a member of the team that won the gold medal in the men's Eights.

Currently, Marland lives and works in Ottawa, Ontario for Royal LePage, a Canadian real estate franchiser. Rob is one of Canada's most successful realtors and his focus on delivering results has placed Rob among the top one percent of Royal LePage realtors in Canada, earning him the National Chairman's Club Award.

He holds a B.A. in Economics from Trent University. He has also completed Real Estate Phase I, II & III, Real Estate Law, and Appraisal from the Ontario Real Estate Association.

Marland is married to Jane Forsyth. Together, they have three daughters Kate, Annie, and Molly.

References

External links
 Canadian Olympic Committee
 

1964 births
Living people
Canadian male rowers
World Rowing Championships medalists for Canada
Canadian real estate agents
Olympic rowers of Canada
Olympic gold medalists for Canada
Rowers at the 1988 Summer Olympics
Rowers at the 1992 Summer Olympics
Olympic medalists in rowing
Medalists at the 1992 Summer Olympics
Trent University alumni
Sportspeople from Mississauga